Antony Morgan "Tony" Madigan (4 February 1930 –  29 October 2017) was an Australian boxer and rugby player. He competed in boxing at the 1952, 1956 and 1960 Olympics and finished in fifth, fifth and third place, respectively. In 1960 Madigan lost his semi-final to Muhammad Ali. He also won medals at three Commonwealth Games in the light-heavyweight division – a silver in 1954 and gold in 1958 and 1962.

Tony was the 2010 Inductee for the Australian National Boxing Hall of Fame Veterans category.

Biography

Madigan's father Kendall Morgan Madigan (1908–1938) was a doctor and mother Elsie Maud Loydstrom (1911–1983) was a dentist. He has a younger brother Mark. His father died in 1938 as a result of cancer. Madigan grew up in Bathurst and Maitland before his mother moved to Sydney to work as a dentist. 

Madigan attended Waverley College in Sydney where he took boxing lessons with Australian champion Hughie Dwyer and sparred with leading professional boxers. In the 1950s, he spent time in the United States being coached by leading trainer Cus D'Amato. After returning to Australia, he sold EH Holdens with rugby league player Rex Mossop. 

On 17 January 1955, Madigan suffered serious injuries in a car crash in Bavaria, West Germany. His 23-year-old passenger Helen Stokes-Smith was killed when on an icy road Madigan lost control when trying to avoid a parked truck. 

Madigan married a German psychotherapist, Sybille, in November 1960 and their son Kendall Morgan Madigan was born in August 1961.Madigan is also father to a daughter, Elizabeth Phy Collins who was born in NYC in 1960.

In the mid-1960s, Madigan sold property investments and had a successful modeling career in London. He then moved to New York City and commenced modeling with Howard Zieff, a renowned photographer.

Rugby union
Madigan played rugby union for Randwick Rugby Club (14 first-grade matches, two tries, 1950) and Eastern Suburbs Rugby Club (1951, 1957 and 1963). Outside Australia, he played Harlequins Rugby (1953) in London and Westchester Rugby Club (1960–1962) in New York. In 1960, he represented the United States Eastern Rugby Union against Quebec Province in Montreal. Madigan generally played as a flyhalf for the Westchester Rugby Club but did play breakaway against Quebec Province in Montreal in the 1962 representative game.

Boxing
Major amateur competitions

Recognition
1962 – Australian flag bearer at the 1962 British Empire and Commonwealth Games
2000 – Australian Sports Medal
2010 – Australian National Boxing Hall of Fame

References

External links
 
 
 
 Madigan – The Man Who Fought Ali Twice, and Lived to Tell the Tale by Robert Messenger, 2016
  Tony Madigan Boxing Results

1930 births
2017 deaths
Boxers from Sydney
Middleweight boxers
Light-heavyweight boxers
Boxers at the 1952 Summer Olympics
Boxers at the 1956 Summer Olympics
Boxers at the 1960 Summer Olympics
Olympic bronze medalists for Australia
Olympic boxers of Australia
Commonwealth Games gold medallists for Australia
Commonwealth Games silver medallists for Australia
Boxers at the 1954 British Empire and Commonwealth Games
Boxers at the 1958 British Empire and Commonwealth Games
Boxers at the 1962 British Empire and Commonwealth Games
Olympic medalists in boxing
Australian male boxers
Medalists at the 1960 Summer Olympics
Commonwealth Games medallists in boxing
Medallists at the 1954 British Empire and Commonwealth Games
Medallists at the 1958 British Empire and Commonwealth Games
Medallists at the 1962 British Empire and Commonwealth Games